Koval is a Ukrainian surname. The word means "blacksmith", making "Koval" the equivalent of "Smith" in the English-speaking world. Notable people with the name include:

 Anastasia Koval (born 1992), Ukrainian artistic gymnast
 Andriy Koval (born 1983), Ukrainian football player
 Denis Koval (born 1991), Russian speed skater
 George Koval (1913–2006),  spy for the Soviet Union in the United States
 Ihor Koval (born 1955), Ukrainian historian and political scholar
 Ivan Koval-Samborsky (1893–1962), Ukrainian stage and film actor
 J. J. Koval (born 1992), American soccer player
 Maksym Koval (born 1992), Ukrainian football goalkeeper
 Mykhailo Koval (born 1956), Ukrainian military officer, Minister of Defence of Ukraine
 Mykola Koval (born 1952), Ukrainian operatic baritone
 Oleksandr Koval (born 1974), Ukrainian football coach and former player
 Peter Kovál (born 1965), American professional photographer
 Ramona Koval (born 1954), Australian reporter
 Robin Koval (born 1955), American businesswoman, author and CEO and president of Truth Initiative
 Stanislav Koval (born 2002), Ukrainian football player
 Vera Koval (born 1983), Russian judoka
 Viktor Koval (1947–2021), Russian writer, poet and actor
 Viktoriya Koval (born 1985), Ukrainian archery athlete
 Vital Koval (born 1980), Belarusian ice hockey goaltender
 Vitalina Koval (born 1990), Ukrainian LGBT rights activist
 Vitaliy Koval (born 1981), Ukrainian entrepreneur and politician
 Vlada Koval (born 2001), Russian tennis player
 Volodymyr Koval (born 1975), Ukrainian-Canadian football player
 Volodymyr Koval (born 1992), Ukrainian football player
 Yevgeni Koval (born 1973), Russian football player
 Yuriy Koval (born 1958), Ukrainian football coach, Director of Sport for the club Zorya Luhansk, and former player
 Yuriy Koval (born 1980), Ukrainian Greco-Roman wrestler
 Yury Koval (1938–1995), Russian author

See also 
 
 Koval (disambiguation)
 Kowal (surname)
 Kovalyov, a surname
 Kovalenko, a surname

References 

Ukrainian-language surnames